The following highways are numbered 954:

Canada
 Saskatchewan Highway 954

India
 National Highway 954 (India)

United States